Yoshinaga Sakurai (born 6 November 1949) is a Japanese equestrian. He competed in the individual dressage event at the 1992 Summer Olympics.

References

1949 births
Living people
Japanese male equestrians
Japanese dressage riders
Olympic equestrians of Japan
Equestrians at the 1992 Summer Olympics
Place of birth missing (living people)